Robert Hays (born July 24, 1947) is an American actor, known for a variety of television and film roles since the 1970s. He came to prominence around 1980, co-starring in the two-season domestic sitcom Angie, and playing the central role of pilot Ted Striker in the hit spoof film Airplane! (also known as Flying High) and its sequel. Other film roles include the lead role in the comedy Take This Job and Shove It (1981), and Bob Seaver, one of the main human characters in Homeward Bound: The Incredible Journey (1993). On television, he starred in the science fiction series Starman (1986–1987) and the short-lived workplace sitcom FM (1989–1990), played the voice of Tony Stark on Iron Man (1994), and had a guest role as Bud Hyde on That '70s Show (2000).

Career
In 1977, Hays played a military corporal in an episode of the television series Wonder Woman. He starred in several short-lived television series, including the 1978 production The Young Pioneers on ABC; the 1979–1980 series Angie; Starman, and FM. 

He was cast as Ted Striker, the washed up pilot who needs to save the day in Airplane! (1980), a spoof of disaster films such as the Airport series, and returned for Airplane II: The Sequel. In 1981, he hosted the sketch comedy television series Saturday Night Live. He played a man thought to be Hyde's dad in several episodes of That '70s Show. 

He has performed in many television movies and done voice work, such as the title character in the Marvel Comics adaptation of Iron Man. In 2013, Hays appeared in a slapstick-laden TV spot promoting tourism in Wisconsin, which also reunited him with Airplane! co-director David Zucker.

Personal life
Hays married musician and singer Cherie Currie on May 12, 1990. The couple have a son, Jake. Hays and Currie divorced in 1997 after seven years of marriage.

Filmography

Film

Television

Production credits

References

External links 

1947 births
Living people
20th-century American male actors
21st-century American male actors
American male film actors
American male television actors
American male voice actors
Male actors from Maryland
People from Bellevue, Nebraska
People from Bethesda, Maryland
People from Sarpy County, Nebraska